USS West View, also spelled Westview, was a cargo ship that served in the United States Navy from 1918 to 1919.

SS West View was built in 1918 as a commercial cargo ship at Portland, Oregon by the Northwest Steel Company for the United States Shipping Board. Although she was never assigned a naval registry identification number, she was delivered to the Navy on 21 November 1918 and commissioned the same day as USS West View at Puget Sound Navy Yard in Bremerton, Washington.

Assigned to the Naval Overseas Transportation Service, West View departed the United States West Coast with a cargo of 7,200 tons of flour. Voyaging via the Panama Canal, she arrived at New York City on 12 January 1919.

After this lone voyage, West View was decommissioned at New York City on 20 January 1919 and was transferred to the United States Shipping Board and stricken from the Navy List the same day.

Once again SS West View, she lay in reserve in the James River in Virginia in the custody of the U.S.Shipping Board and its successor, the United States Maritime Commission until ca. 1938, when she probably was scrapped due to age and deterioration.

References

Department of the Navy: Naval Historical Center Online Library of Selected Images: Civilian Ships: S.S. West View (American Freighter, 1918). Served as USS West View in 1918–1919. Name also spelled Westview
NavSource Online: Section Patrol Craft Photo Archive: West View

Ships built in Portland, Oregon
1918 ships
Auxiliary ships of the United States Navy